Cath Finntrágha (The Battle of Ventry) is an Early Modern Irish prose narrative of the Finn Cycle. It dates probably to the 15th century in its current form, but apparently relied on older material. It concerns the deeds of the warrior-hero Finn mac Cumaill and his fianna as they defend Ireland against a foreign invasion led by the world-king Dáire Donn.

Synopsis
Dáire (or Dáiri) Donn, called "king of the great world" and ostensibly the most powerful ruler in Europe, intends to invade Ireland. Apart from seeking to gratify a more general ambition to conquer territory, he has a pretext and motif which are directed at Finn mac Cumaill in person. First of all, Dáire seeks retribution for the fact that Finn has eloped with the wife and daughter of Bolcán (Vulcan), King of France, when in the mercenary service of the latter. Second, Dáire's sense of honour and pride is ignited by stories about Finn's successes. He musters a large body of forces from all across Europe and invades Ireland at Finntraighe (lit. 'fair strand'), the shore of Ventry (County Kerry), near Dingle. A mighty and protracted battle ensues. Finn's son Oisín faces Bolcán in combat, who much like Suibne Geilt, goes insane and flies off, ultimately landing at Glenn Bolcáin. The young son of the King of Ulster arrives with a troop of boys to rally to Finn's support but is killed. It is only when the Tuatha Dé Danann are called in that the Irish become victorious. When Finn slays Dáire Donn and the Greek amazon Ógarmach, the invaders admit defeat and take flight.

Manuscripts and textual history
The text in its present form was probably written in the 15th century and is represented by two vellum manuscripts: (1) Oxford, Bodleian Library, MS Rawlinson B. 487, 1–11, and (2) Dublin, Royal Irish Academy, MS 29 (olim 23 L 24), 328–337, 355–361. In a note to Rawlinson B. 487, the scribe Finnlaech Ó Cathasaigh of Tirawley (County Mayo) declares to have composed the tale for Sadbh Ní Mháille (daughter of Tadg Ó Maille), wife of Richard MacWilliam Bourke (d. 1479).

Earlier allusions to Finn's battle at Ventry suggest that one or several versions of the story were current as early as the 12th century. The event is first referred to in a love-story of the Acallam na Senórach, in which Finn sets out to meet the enemy in battle, but interrupts the journey to act as a match-maker for Cáel and Créde. During the seventeen days of the battle, the couple offer assistance to Finn, but on the last day, Cáel drowns at sea in pursuit of an opponent and Créde dies of grief. The story is also told in the 15th-century Cath Finntrágha, but this appears to offer a thoroughly revised tale, which incorporates miscellaneous narrative material from the Finn Cycle, the Ulster Cycle and the Mythological Cycle. It has been argued<by who? source?> that much of its framework was suggested by the earlier tale Cath Trága Rudraigi (The Battle of Dundrum Bay), in which Norsemen forces invade Ireland and do battle at Dundrum Bay (County Down).

Editions 

The text was edited and translated by Kuno Meyer (1885) from the vellum manuscript Bodleian Library, Rawlinson B 487, with variants from Egerton 149. Cecil O'Rahilly later published and edition and translation, also from Ms. Rawlinson B 487.

Antiquarian commentary
John O'Donovan provides a number of interesting insights into the Battle of Ventry in his Ordnance Survey letters of 1841. He noted several burial carns near Cantraw, presumed evidence of a great slaughter, along with local claims of finds of many bones and skulls at the east end of the strand. He also noted a boggy area known for the slaughter of the mighty men,  Guin na dTreanfhear.

Popular culture
The Novel 'Storm Shield' by Kenneth C. Flint is based on the characters and events of the Battle of Ventry.

Explanatory notes

References

Bibliography

Acallam na Senórach
 

. e-text via CELT corpus.

Cath Finntrágha
 ; e-text via maryjones.us
 . online edition via CELT

See also
 Dáire Doimthech

Early Irish literature
Fenian Cycle